Mike Taylor (born October 7, 1989) is an American football linebacker who is currently a free agent. He played college football at the University of Wisconsin-Madison. He has been a member of the Seattle Seahawks of the National Football League.

College career

2008
Taylor redshirted his first season. He was named Wisconsin's defensive scout player of the week at Indiana on November 8.

2009
Taylor was named on the Big Ten All-Freshman Team by Sporting News. Taylor played and started seven games as a freshman. Taylor suffered a season-ending knee injury against Iowa. He led the leam with 46 tackles at the time of his injury.

2010
Taylor was named consensus honorable mention All-Big Ten. Taylor played in and started 12 games. He was second on the team in tackles-for-loss, tied for second in interceptions and fourth in tackles.

2011
Taylor was named first-team All-Big Ten by the media and second-team by the coaches. He was also chosen as UW's co-Jimmy Demetral Team MVP. He was named Big Ten Defensive Player of the week two times in 2011. First was against Oregon State after recording nine tackles, forcing a fumble, recording 1.5 TFLs and adding a sack. Second was against Nebraska after recording 14 tackles with one tackle for loss and one interception. Taylor also recorded a career high 22 tackles against Ohio State, the most by a Badger since 1998. Before the season, Taylor was on the watchlist for the Butkus Award which is awarded to the nations best linebacker. Taylor was also listed on the preseason watchlists for All-Big Ten, first-team by Althon and Blue Ribbon and second-team by Phil Steele.

2012
Taylor was named first-team All-Big Ten by the media and honorable mention by the coaches. Recorded a season high 15 tackles twice against Utah State on September 15 and Nebraska on September 29. Before the season Taylor was on the watchlists for the Bronko Nagurski Trophy, Lombardi Award and the Lott IMPACT Award.

College statistics

Professional career
Taylor underwent surgery for a sports hernia in March 2013 and therefore missed the NFL Scouting Combine and the Wisconsin Pro Day. Taylor went undrafted during the 2013 NFL Draft. Since October 7, 2013, Taylor has had tryouts with the Green Bay Packers, Kansas City Chiefs and Seattle Seahawks.

Seattle Seahawks
On December 11, 2013, Taylor signed with the Seattle Seahawks practice squad. He was released on December 19.

The Seahawks signed Taylor to a futures contract on February 10, 2014. On August 11, Taylor was placed on the injured-reserve/waived list.

References

External links
 Wisconsin Badgers bio

1989 births
Living people
People from Ashwaubenon, Wisconsin
Players of American football from Wisconsin
American football linebackers
Wisconsin Badgers football players
Seattle Seahawks playersq